Alberto Comazzi (born 16 April 1979) is an Italian footballer who is currently suspended by Italian Football Federation.

He last played for Swindon Town in the Football League Two as a defender.

Career

Italy
He developed in the youth team of Milan, his Serie A debut in the Rossoneri shirt was when he was 18 was on 1 June 1997 in the defeat (1–0) for the Rossoneri at the San Siro against Cagliari.

In the 1998–99 season, he was loaned to Como in Serie C1. After some initial difficulties, he became more successful there and so did the rest of the team, they chased leaders Alzano virescit. After finishing second, the Larians were eliminated during the playoff semifinals against Pistoia. The following season finished with Lariana in tenth place.

In 2000–01 he went to Monza in Serie B, at that time there were frequent changes of coach. He was then bought by Lazio, although failed to make an appearance in Serie A.

He was then transferred to Verona, with whom he was a regular starter with. He spent five seasons with them in Serie B, the last of which in 2006–07, was when the La Scala were relegated to Serie C1. He then stayed in Verona in the season after competing in 25 games (with a goal scored).

In July 2008 he moved on loan to Ancona.

He signed an annual contract with Spezia, newly promoted to Lega Pro Prima Divisione on 8 July 2010.

England
It was confirmed in June 2011 that Swindon Town manager Paolo Di Canio was interested in signing Comazzi for the 2011–12 season. He officially signed for Swindon on 28 June. In January 2012 his contract with Swindon Town was terminated.

Italian football scandal
On 18 June 2012 Comazzi was suspended for 4 years due to 2011–12 Italian football scandal.

References

External links
Profile at Lega-Calcio.it

1979 births
Living people
Italian footballers
Italian expatriate footballers
Association football defenders
Serie A players
Serie B players
English Football League players
Hellas Verona F.C. players
A.C. Milan players
A.C. Ancona players
S.S. Lazio players
A.C. Monza players
Como 1907 players
Swindon Town F.C. players
Expatriate footballers in England